Anthotroche  walcottii is a  small to medium hardy shrub with attractive purple and white star shaped flowers. It is native to sandy areas of Western Australia and has some tolerance of salt spray. Grow from seed.

References

Ellison, Don (1999) Cultivated Plants of the World. London: New Holland (1st ed.: Brisbane: Flora Publications International, 1995)

Eudicots of Western Australia
Nicotianoideae
Taxa named by Ferdinand von Mueller